Daniel William Downes (born April 8, 1986) is a retired American mixed martial artist. 
Even after his retirement, Downes has still continued to stick around the sport of MMA. 
He became what some call a "fighter turned writer", as he now writes for various MMA media outlets, including MMAjunkie.com

Mixed martial arts career
Since turning professional in 2007, Downes has competed for several smaller organizations, while compiling an undefeated record and obtaining wins in promotions such as King of the Cage, with all of his fights taking place in his native Wisconsin. Downes is a training partner of former WEC champion Anthony Pettis under the tutelage of Duke Roufus.

Downes handed David Kless his first professional loss at a Gladiators Cage Fighting event via unanimous decision. Downes picked up the biggest win of his career at KOTC Turbulence 2, defeating Bruce Johnson via first round TKO.

World Extreme Cagefighting
Downes made his WEC debut against Chris Horodecki, replacing an injured Ed Ratcliff with only a few days notice on June 20, 2010 at WEC 49.  WEC commissioner Reed Harris confirmed the addition of Downes to the card on The Daily Line, adding that the WEC had had their eye on Downes for a while.  He lost the fight via submission in the third round.

Downes fought Chinese prospect Zhang Tiequan on December 16, 2010 at WEC 53. Downes won the fight via unanimous decision (29-28, 30-27, 29-28).

Ultimate Fighting Championship
On October 28, 2010, World Extreme Cagefighting merged with the Ultimate Fighting Championship. As part of the merger, all WEC fighters were transferred to the UFC.

Downes faced Jeremy Stephens on June 4, 2011 at The Ultimate Fighter 13 Finale, replacing an injured Jonathan Brookins. He lost the fight via unanimous decision.

Downes next fought Ramsey Nijem on October 29, 2011 at UFC 137. He lost the fight via unanimous decision and was subsequently released from the promotion.

Shortly afterwards, Downes retired from the sport.

Personal life
Downes, a native of Chicago, is a graduate of Marquette University with degrees in International Affairs and German.

Mixed martial arts record 

|-
| Loss
| align=center| 8–3
| Ramsey Nijem
| Decision (unanimous) 
| UFC 137
| 
| align=center| 3
| align=center| 5:00
| Las Vegas, Nevada, United States
| 
|-
| Loss
| align=center| 8–2
| Jeremy Stephens
| Decision (unanimous)
| The Ultimate Fighter 13 Finale
| 
| align=center| 3
| align=center| 5:00
| Las Vegas, Nevada, United States
| 
|-
| Win
| align=center| 8–1
| Taurean Bogguess
| Submission (triangle choke)
| NAFC: Mayhem
| 
| align=center| 1
| align=center| 3:24
| Milwaukee, Wisconsin, United States
| 
|-
| Win
| align=center| 7–1
| Zhang Tiequan
| Decision (unanimous)
| WEC 53  
| 
| align=center| 3
| align=center| 5:00
| Glendale, Arizona, United States
| 
|-
| Loss
| align=center| 6–1
| Chris Horodecki
| Submission (rear-naked choke) 
| WEC 49
| 
| align=center| 3
| align=center| 1:09
| Edmonton, Alberta, Canada
| 
|-
|  Win
| align=center| 6–0
| Bruce Johnson
| TKO (punches)
| KOTC: Turbulence 2
| 
| align=center| 1
| align=center| 4:56
| Lac du Flambeau, Wisconsin, United States
| 
|-
| Win
| align=center| 5–0
| David Kless
| Decision (unanimous)
| GCF: Strength and Honor
| 
| align=center| 3
| align=center| 5:00
| West Allis, Wisconsin, United States
| 
|-
| Win
| align=center| 4–0
| Jake Omen
| TKO (punches)
| GCF: The Good, the Bad and the Ugly
| 
| align=center| 2
| align=center| 4:24
| Milwaukee, Wisconsin, United States
| 
|-
| Win
| align=center| 3–0
| Gustavo Rodriguez
| TKO (punches)
| Evolution Fighting Championships 6
| 
| align=center| 1
| align=center| 2:19
| Fond du Lac, Wisconsin, United States
| 
|-
| Win
| align=center| 2–0 
| Mike Sandez
| TKO (punches)
| GFS: Season's Beatings
| 
| align=center| 1
| align=center| 3:14
| Milwaukee, Wisconsin, United States
| 
|-
| Win
| align=center| 1–0
| John Lovejoy
| TKO (punches)
| GFS: Caged Colosseum
| 
| align=center| 1
| align=center| 1:00
| West Allis, Wisconsin, United States
|

References

External links
Official UFC Profile

Living people
American male mixed martial artists
Mixed martial artists from Illinois
Mixed martial artists from Wisconsin
Lightweight mixed martial artists
1986 births
Sportspeople from Chicago
Marquette University alumni
Sportspeople from Milwaukee
Ultimate Fighting Championship male fighters